Tsutsui (written: 筒井 meaning "round well") is a Japanese surname. Notable people with the surname include:

, Japanese artist
, Japanese warrior monk
, Japanese daimyō
, Japanese daimyō
, Japanese baseball player
, Japanese volleyball player
, Japanese politician
, Japanese footballer
Ryohei Ron Tsutsui (born 1977), Japanese film producer
, Japanese samurai
Shan Tsutsui (born 1971), American politician
William Tsutsui, American academic
, Japanese writer and actor

See also
Tsutsui clan, Japanese clan
Tsutsui Station (disambiguation), multiple railway stations in Japan

Japanese-language surnames